Where the Girls Are is a music and comedy special that aired on NBC in 1968.

Noel Harrison, fresh from his role in the NBC series Girl From U.N.C.L.E., hosted the hour-long special. Comic skits were performed by Professor Irwin Corey and Don Adams, who was starring in the NBC series Get Smart.

Musical numbers were performed by The Association, Barbara McNair, Cher and The Byrds. The "Close-Up" for the program in the April 20–26, 1968 TV Guide also notes: "The goings-on include antic camerawork and a bevy of mini-clad beauties."

Celanese Arnel was a major sponsor.

The special was broadcast on Tuesday, April 23, 1968. It pre-empted The Jerry Lewis Show on NBC's network schedule.

Musical numbers

References
 (1968, April 20–26). TV Guide, Washington-Baltimore Edition, pp. A-57—A-57.

Musical television specials
NBC television specials
1960s American television specials
1968 television specials
1960s in comedy